George Williams (October 23, 1939 – May 14, 2009) was an American professional baseball second baseman. He played in Major League Baseball (MLB) for three different teams between the 1961 and 1964 seasons. He was born in Detroit, Michigan.

Williams entered the majors in 1961 with the Philadelphia Phillies, playing for them for one year before joining the Houston Colt .45's in 1962 and the Kansas City Athletics in 1964.

In a three season career, Williams was a .230 hitter (31-for-135) with 15 runs and five runs batted in in 59 games including seven doubles without any home runs.

An 11-season minor league veteran, Williams hit .277 with 71 homers and 430 RBI in 1,143 games for 10 teams from 1958 through 1968.

In between, he played for the Leones del Caracas club of the Venezuelan Winter League during the 1966–1967 season.

Williams died from lung cancer in his home city of Detroit at the age of 69.

External links

Retrosheet
Venezuelan Professional Baseball League

1939 births
2009 deaths
African-American baseball players
Bakersfield Bears players
Baseball players from Detroit
Dallas Rangers players
Deaths from cancer in Michigan
Deaths from lung cancer
Des Moines Demons players
Elmira Pioneers players
Houston Colt .45s players
Indianapolis Indians players
Jacksonville Suns players
Johnson City Phillies players
Kansas City Athletics players
Leones del Caracas players
American expatriate baseball players in Venezuela
Major League Baseball second basemen
Oklahoma City 89ers players
Philadelphia Phillies players
Phoenix Giants players
Tacoma Giants players
20th-century African-American sportspeople
21st-century African-American people